The 2010–11 Dukat Premijer Liga season is the twentieth season since its establishment and third in the Premier league format.

Teams

League table

2010-11 winning team

RK Croatia Osiguranje Zagreb
GK: Marin Šego, Ivan Pešić, Gorazd Škof, Filip Ivić
LB: Tonči Valčić, Jakov Gojun, Goran Bogunović
CB: Ivano Balić, David Špiler
RB: Luka Stepančić, Luka Šebetić
RW: Zlatko Horvat, Adnan Jaskić, Jerko Matulić Filip Čelić
LW: Ljubo Vukić, Manuel Štrlek
LP: Michal Kopčo, Gyula Gál, Marino Marić, Ilija Brozović
Head coach: Ivica Obrvan
Source: eurohandball.com

References

Sources
HRS
Sport.net.hr
Rk-zamet.hr
Rijeka.hr

Croatian Premier Handball League seasons
2010–11 domestic handball leagues
2011 in Croatian sport
2010 in Croatian sport